Yang Lian is the name of:

Yang Lian (prince) (died 940), prince of Wu during the Five Dynasties and Ten Kingdoms period
Yang Lian (poet) (born 1955), Swiss-born Chinese poet
Yang Lian (weightlifter) (born 1982), Chinese weightlifter